Major Barbara is a 1941 British film starring Wendy Hiller and Rex Harrison. The film was produced and directed by Gabriel Pascal and edited by David Lean. It was adapted for the screen by Marjorie Deans and Anatole de Grunwald, based on the 1905 stage play Major Barbara by George Bernard Shaw. It was both a critical and a financial success.

Plot
In this social satire, Barbara Undershaft (Hiller), an idealistic major in the Salvation Army, is deeply troubled by the fact that her father, Andrew Undershaft (Robert Morley), is a wealthy weapons manufacturer. Meanwhile, Andrew is looking for an heir for his industrial empire, in particular a foundling like himself.

Cast
Wendy Hiller as Major Barbara Undershaft
Rex Harrison as Adolphus Cusins
Robert Morley as Andrew Undershaft
Robert Newton as Bill Walker
Sybil Thorndike as The General
Emlyn Williams as Snobby Price
Miles Malleson as Morrison, the butler
Donald Calthrop as Peter Shirley (died during filming)
Marie Lohr as Lady Britomart
Stanley Holloway as a Policeman
Marie Ault as Rummy Mitchens
Penelope Dudley-Ward as Sarah Undershaft
Walter Hudd as Stephen Undershaft
David Tree as Charles Lomax
Deborah Kerr as Jenny Hill
Torin Thatcher as Todger Fairmile
Felix Aylmer as James
Kathleen Harrison as Mrs. Price
Edward Rigby as Man on Quayside

Production
Major Barbara was filmed in London during The Blitz bombing of 1940. During air raids, the crew and cast repeatedly had to dodge into bomb shelters. The film's producer-director, Pascal, never stopped the production and the film was completed on schedule.

According to another account the film was meant to take ten weeks but took twenty weeks. The original budget of £130,000 was insufficient to complete it so J. Arthur Rank provided £100,000 necessary. This resulted in Rank making a full commitment to investing in films.

Reception

Box Office
According to Kinematograph Weekly it was the sixth most popular film of 1941 in Britain, after 49th Parallel, Great Dictator, Pimpernel Smith and Lady Hamilton.

Critical reception
In a contemporary review, Bosley Crowther wrote in The New York Times, "To call it a manifest triumph would be arrant stinginess with words. For this is something more than just a brilliant and adult translation of a stimulating play, something more than a captivating compound of ironic humor and pity. This is a lasting memorial to the devotion of artists working under fire, a permanent proof for posterity that it takes more than bombs to squelch the English wit. It is as wry and impudent a satire of conventional morals and social creeds as though it had been made in a time of easy and carefree peace. It is, in short, a more triumphant picture than any the British have yet sent across." while more recently, Time Out wrote, "There is plenty to relish, notably Newton and Morley hamming it up (as, respectively, the rumbustious Bill Walker and the overbearing tycoon), and Deborah Kerr in her debut; but it does tend to just sit there. It was David Lean's first shot at directing, but producer Pascal helmed the bulk of it."

Home media
Major Barbara was released on DVD by The Criterion Collection on 23 February 2010, as part of the box set George Bernard Shaw on Film.

References

Notes

Bibliography
 The Great British Films, pp 59–62, Jerry Vermilye, 1978, Citadel Press,

External links

1941 films
1941 comedy films
British comedy films
British films based on plays
British black-and-white films
Films directed by Gabriel Pascal
The Salvation Army
British satirical films
Films produced by Gabriel Pascal
Films based on works by George Bernard Shaw
Films scored by William Walton
Films directed by Harold French
Films with screenplays by Anatole de Grunwald
1940s English-language films
1940s British films